Marji is a feminine given name. Notable people with the name include:

 Marji Armstrong (born 1943), Australian horse trainer
 Marji Campi, British actress
 Marjane "Marji" Satrapi, Iranian-born French graphic novelist and film director

See also
 Margie
 Margy

Feminine given names